T. K. Ramachandran  (died October 1993), was an Indian actor and film producer, who worked in Tamil cinema. He was a popular villain and character actor in many movies in 50's and also acted as hero in initial years. In 1966 he produced the movie "Periya Manithan" under the banner Saraswathi Productions starring Kannada actress Uday Chandrika in lead with him in supporting role, directed by K. C. Krishna Moorthy. Later acted in some 70's movies including the 1978 Rajinikanth starer Bairavi and acted until 1982.

Notable films

Actor 
 Naam Iruvar - 1947
 Digambara Samiyar - 1950
 Mohana Sundaram - 1951
 Singari – 1951
 Chinnadurai – 1952
 Parasakthi – 1952
 Mappillai – 1952
 Ponamachan Thirumbivandhan – 1954
 Kathanayaki – 1955
 Town Bus – 1955
 Madurai Veeran – 1956
 Marmaveeran – 1956
 Mudhalali – 1957
 Piyamilan – 1958
 Neelavukku Neranja Manasu – 1958
 Aval Yar – 1959
 Uthama Pethra Rathinam – 1959
 Raja Desingu – 1960
 Chavukkadi Chandrakantha – 1960
 ninaipatharku neramillai – 1963
 Shabash Mappillai – 1961
 Azhagu Nila – 1962
 Periya Manithan – 1966
 Eduppar Kai Pillai – 1975
 Bairavi - 1978
 Anru Muthal Inru Varai – 1981
 Vetri Namathe – 1982
 Vanjikottai Vaaliban - 1958
 Mangalya Manickam
 Manithan Maaravilai
 Thayiku Pin Thamayan – 1955
 Menaka - 1955

Producer 
 Periya Manithan - 1966

References 

1993 deaths
Male actors in Tamil cinema